The National Confederation of Free Trade Unions of Romania – Brotherhood ( or ) is the largest national trade union center in Romania. It was created from the 1993 merger of the National Confederation of Free Trade Unions of Romania (CNSLR) and Frăţia.

The CNSLR is the reformed organization of previous communist era unions. Membership has declined to its current level of 800,000, but it is still by far the largest of the trade union centers in the country.

CNSLR-Frăţia is affiliated with the International Trade Union Confederation, and the European Trade Union Confederation.

References

External links
CNSLR-Frăţia official site

1993 establishments in Romania
International Trade Union Confederation
European Trade Union Confederation
National trade union centers of Romania
Trade unions established in 1993